Kidd Video (originally in development as Hot Rocks) is an American Saturday morning live action/cartoon created by DIC Enterprises in association with Saban Productions. The series originally ran on NBC from 1984 to 1985. Reruns continued on the network until 1987 when CBS picked the show up.

In the show, four teenagers are taken into a strange dimension called "the Flipside" and become cartoon characters, forced to fight the Master Blaster and his gang, the Copy Cats. The show included then-current music videos.

Ownership of the series passed to Disney in 2001 when Disney acquired Fox Kids Worldwide, which also includes Saban Entertainment. The series is not available on Disney+.

Premise
The title sequence explained the plot; Kidd Video and his band (Named Kidd, Carla, Ash, & Whiz) of the same name (played by live action performers in the first half of the title sequence) were practicing in a storage unit when an animated villain named the Master Blaster appeared, and transported them to the Master Blaster's home dimension, a cartoon world called the Flipside. The Master Blaster plans to use them as his musical slaves. They were rescued by a fairy named Glitter and subsequently spent each episode of the series either helping to free the denizens of the Flipside from the Master Blaster's rule, or trying to find a way back home to the "real world".

The show was dominated by an MTV-esque music video theme. Each episode featured at least one action sequence set to a popular song, and the heroes would often distract their enemies by showing current music videos and sneak off while the enemies were entranced. Each episode also ended with a live-action music video by Kidd Video. Other pop cultural current events featured heavily in the show as well: the characters often breakdanced to relax, rode on skateboards and one episode was devoted entirely to video games. The visual style of the cartoon itself was heavily influenced by the more surreal videos showing on MTV and by album artwork of the era by artists like Roger Dean.

The band was created specifically for the show; they performed their own songs and they provided the voices for their cartoon counterparts. At the end of some episodes, the live action band would be shown once again performing a music video, such as "A Little TLC". The music videos produced by Kidd Video then became very popular in Israel, which then produced fan merchandise such as coloring books and chocolate bars with images of the band.

Characters
 Kidd Video (portrayed and voiced by Bryan Scott) - Lead singer and guitarist of Kidd Video. 
 Carla (portrayed and voiced by Gabriela Nelson) - The drummer of Kidd Video and the band's sole female member. Her frequently-uttered catch-phrase was "Ay-Ay-Ay!"
 Whiz (portrayed and voiced by Robbie Rist) - The nerdy guitar-and bass-player of Kidd Video. He owned a Subaru Brat which was in the garage at the time of the band's abduction and also got pulled into the Flipside. As a result, it now serves as the group's main transport through the music world.
 Ash (portrayed and voiced by Steve Alterman) - The clumsy keyboardist of Kidd Video; he also plays bass and saxophone.
 Glitter (voiced by Cathy Cavadini) - A fairy who befriends Kidd Video's band. She saved them from the Master Blaster, as seen in the introduction, with her unique ability to temporarily gain enhanced strength whenever she sneezes.
 Toolbot (voiced by Hal Rayle) - A robotic toolbox that debuted in Season Two. He is Whiz's pet.
 The Master Blaster (voiced by Peter Renaday) - The primary villain of the series. He brought Kidd Video's band to the Flipside to be his musical slaves until Glitter freed them. As a caricature of a corrupt rock manager or music executive, the Master Blaster flew around the sky in his floating castle, which resembled a giant jukebox.
 The Copycats - A trio of anthropomorphic cats that serve as the Master Blaster's minions. They get their name because they always lip-synch to their songs. They consist of:
 Cool Kitty (voiced by Robert Towers) - The leader of the Copycats.
 Fat Cat (voiced by Marshall Efron) - The overweight member of the Copycats.
 She-Lion (voiced by Susan Silo) - The female member of the Copycats.

List of episodes

Pilot (1984)
 Pilot - September 8, 1984

Season 1 (1984–85)
 To Beat the Band - September 15, 1984
 The Master Zapper - September 22, 1984
 Woofers and Tweeters - October 6, 1984
 Barnacolis - October 13, 1984
 The Pink Sphinx - October 27, 1984
 Cienega - February 16, 1985
 The Lost Note - February 23, 1985
 Music Sports - March 2, 1985
 Chameleons - March 23, 1985
 Euphonius and the Melodious Dragon - May 5, 1985
 Professor Maestro - May 12, 1985
 Grooveyard City - May 19, 1985
 The Stone - May 26, 1985

Season 2 (1985)
 The Dream Machine - November 2, 1985
 Double Trouble - November 2, 1985
 No Place Like Home - November 9, 1985
 Having a Ball - November 16, 1985
 Old Time Rocks that Roll - November 23, 1985
 Starmaker - November 23, 1985
 Narra Takes a Powder - November 23, 1985
 Race to Popland - November 23, 1985
 Master Blaster Brat - November 23, 1985
 Twilight Double Header - November 23, 1985
 A Friend in Need - November 30, 1985
 Pirates and Puzzles - November 30, 1985
 Who's in the Kitchen with Dinah? - December 7, 1985

Cast
 Bryan Scott - Kidd Video
 Steve Alterman - Ash
 Robbie Rist - Whiz
 Gabriela Nelson - Carla

Voices
 Michael Bell - Additional Voices (Season 2)
 Cathy Cavadini - Glitter
 Marshall Efron - Fat Cat; Additional Voices (Season 2)
 Hal Rayle - Toolbot (Season 2)
 Peter Renaday - The Master Blaster; Additional Voices (Season 2)
 Susan Silo - She-Lion
 Robert Towers - Cool Kitty; Additional Voices (Season 1)

Music
The theme song, "Video to Radio", was written by frequent musical collaborators Haim Saban and Shuki Levy, who also contributed other songs to the show. The song "Time" was written by band member Bryan Scott. The song "A Little TLC" composed by Lynsey de Paul and Terry Britten and accompanying video was featured at the end of the first episode "To Beat the Band" and the end of the last episode "Who's in the Kitchen with Dinah?".

Kidd Video released a vinyl album in Israel and the band reportedly toured there in 1987.

Home video
Six VHS tapes with a single episode each were released in the United States from DiC Video & Golden Books and numerous Spanish-language tapes were available from Vídeo Peques under the Travelling Video line.

See also

References

External links
 

1980s American animated television series
1980s American musical comedy television series
1984 American television series debuts
1985 American television series endings
American boy bands
American children's animated comedy television series
American children's animated musical television series
American television series with live action and animation
English-language television shows
Fictional musical groups
NBC original programming
Television series by DIC Entertainment
Television series by Saban Entertainment
Television series created by Jean Chalopin
Television series about parallel universes